Nigel Cawthorne (born 27 March 1951 in Wolverhampton) is a British freelance writer of fiction and non-fiction, and an editor. 

According to Cawthorne's website, he has written more than 150 books on a wide range of subjects. He also contributed to The Guardian, the Daily Mirror, the Daily Mail, and the New-York Tribune. He has appeared on television and BBC Radio 4's Today programme.

Works

Series
Prisoner of War series
The Bamboo Cage: The Full Story of the American Servicemen Still Missing in Vietnam, 1991
The Iron Cage

Sex Lives series
Sex Lives of the Popes
Sex Lives of the US Presidents
Sex Lives of the Great Dictators
Sex Lives of the Kings and Queens of England
Sex Lives of the Hollywood Goddesses
Sex Lives of the Hollywood Goddesses 2
Sex Lives of the Hollywood Idols
Sex Lives of the Great Artists
Sex Lives of the Great Composers
Sex Lives of the Famous Gays
Sex Lives of the Famous Lesbians
Sex Lives of the Roman Emperors

Old England series
Strange Laws of Old England
Curious Cures of Old England
Amorous Antics of Old England
Sex Secrets of Old England

The Art of series
The Art of Japanese Prints
The Art of India
The Art of Native North America
The Art of the Aztecs
The Art of Icons
The Art of Frescoes

Mammoth Books
The Mammoth Book of New CSI 
The Mammoth Book of Inside the Elite Forces
The Mammoth Book of Sex Scandals

Brief Histories
A Brief Guide to James Bond 
A Brief Guide to Jeeves and Wooster
A Brief Guide to Sherlock Holmes
A Brief History of Robin Hood

Complete Illustrated Encyclopedias
The Complete Illustrated Encyclopedia of the Lancaster Bomber: The history of Britain's greatest night bomber of World War II, with more than 275 photographs
The Complete Illustrated Encyclopedia of the Spitfire: The history of Britain's most iconic aircraft of World War II, with more than 250 photographs

Books

 Takin' Back My Name: The Confessions of Ike Turner
Tyrants: History's 100 Most Evil Despots & Dictators
Tesla vs Edison: The Life-Long Feud That Electrified The World
Tesla: The Life and Times of an Electric Messiah
Shipwrecks
The Story of the SS: Hitler's Infamous Legions of Death
Public Executions: From Ancient Rome to the Present Day
Confirmed Kill: Heroic Sniper Stories from the Jungles of Vietnam to the Mountains of Afghanistan
Heroes: The True Stories Behind Every VC Winner Since World War II
The World's Worst Atrocities (World's Greatest)
Reaping the Whirlwind: Personal Accounts of the German, Japanese and Italian Experiences of WW II
The New Look: The Dior Revolution
Pirates: An Illustrated History
Stalin: The Murderous Career of the Red Tsar
The "Who": And the Making of "Tommy" (Vinyl Frontier)
Satanic Murder: Chilling True Stories of Sacrificial Slaughter (Virgin)
The World's Most Evil Gangsters
Victory: 100 Great Military Commanders
Stalin's Crimes: The Murderous Career of the Red Tsar
Blitzkrieg: Hitler's Masterplan for the Conquest of Europe
History's Greatest Battles: Masterstrokes of War
Special Forces: War on Terror
Warrior Elite: 31 Heroic Special-Ops Missions from the Raid on Son Tay to the Killing of Osama bin Laden
World at War (Picture This)
Canine Commandos: The Heroism, Devotion, and Sacrifice of Dogs in War
Pirates of the 21st Century: How Modern-Day Buccaneers are Terrorising the World's Oceans
A History of Pirates: Blood and Thunder on the High Seas
Alexander the Great (Life&Times)
 
Witches: A History of Persecution (2012, Arcturus Publishing, Reprinted 2021)

Reception
Cawthorne's work has been negatively received by journalists and academics. In particular, Cawthorne's lack of an academic background and poor editorial standards have attracted criticism.

Tyrants
Ann W. Moore sharply criticized Tyrants in a School Library Journal review of the book:

Jack the Ripper's Secret Confession
"Television director [David] Monaghan and author Cawthorne (Serial Killers and Mass Murderers ) fail to prove their case that Jack the Ripper, ...and a pseudonymous author known only as “Walter” were one and the same. ...the links Monaghan and Cawthorne try to establish with the Ripper ...are flimsy."

Flight MH370: The Mystery
The 2014 Flight MH370: The Mystery proposes a conspiracy theory regarding disappearance of Malaysia Airlines Flight 370. The book was fiercely criticised in The Australian by David Free, who described it as an 'information gumbo' that 'reproduces the slapdash atmosphere of the worst kind of 24-hour news show' and advised readers 'Next time you're in one (a shop), buy any book other than this. I guarantee it won't be worse'. The Daily Telegraph reported some relatives of the victims were angered by the book In a May 2014 segment of the Australian television program Today, co-host Karl Stefanovic also took issue with guest Cawthorne. Stefanovic characterized the book as "disgusting" and insensitive to the families.

Jeremy Corbyn: Leading from the Left
Merryn Williams, writing for the Oxford Left Review said regarding the 2015 book Jeremy Corbyn: Leading from the Left, "His book is neither pro nor anti, though it sometimes uses loaded terms like ‘moderate’ and ‘hard left’. It has been unkindly described on Amazon as ‘a fleshed-out Wikipedia entry’, and there are very many typos, but it does give a fairly accurate account of Jeremy’s career up to September 2015. Hardly anything is said, though, about the fascinating subject of exactly how and why he got elected."

References

20th-century English novelists
21st-century English novelists
English non-fiction writers
People from Bloomsbury
1951 births
Living people
English male novelists
People involved in plagiarism controversies